Neo-bop (also called neotraditionalist) refers to a style of jazz that gained popularity in the 1980s among musicians who found greater aesthetic affinity for acoustically based, swinging, melodic forms of jazz than for free jazz and jazz fusion that had gained prominence in the 1960s and 1970s. Neo-bop is distinct from previous bop music due to the influence of trumpeter Wynton Marsalis, who popularized the genre as an artistic and academic endeavor opposed to the countercultural developments of the beat generation.

Musical style 
Neo-bop contains elements of bebop, post-bop, hard bop, and modal jazz. As both "neo-bop" and "post-bop" refer to eclectic mixtures of styles from the bebop and post-bebop eras, the precise differences in musical style between the two are not clearly defined from an academic standpoint.

In the United States, Wynton Marsalis and "The Young Lions," for example, have been associated with neo-bop and post-bop. Neo-bop was also embraced by established, straight-ahead jazz musicians who either abstained the avant-garde and fusion movements, or returned to music based on more traditional styles after experimenting with them.

The return to more traditionally-based styles earned both praise and criticism, with Miles Davis calling it "warmed over turkey" and others deeming it to be too dependent on the past. The movement, however, received praise from Time magazine and others who welcomed the return of more accessible forms of jazz.

History

1970s: Origins 
Some bebop and post-bop musicians were lukewarm to the avant-garde explorations of the 1960s and rejected the electronically based, pop-influenced sounds of jazz fusion. Most prominent among these was the drummer Art Blakey, whose Jazz Messengers group was a stylistic incubator for like-minded younger musicians. Drummer Cindy Blackman credited Blakey with keeping jazz from being completely eclipsed by fusion during the 1970s.  Many of the younger musicians who went on to form the core of the neotraditionalist "Young Lions," including Wynton Marsalis, were Jazz Messengers alumni.

Albert Murray, in his 1976 book Stomping the Blues, contended that true jazz was based on three elements, swing, blues tonalities, and acoustic sounds.  His ideas influenced Stanley Crouch who, along with Marsalis, became a militant advocate of the core jazz elements as defined by Murray.  Crouch went on to contend that many of the devices of avant-garde and fusion were grandstanding and used as a cover for lazy-mindedness or lack of musicianship. Crouch wrote, "We should laugh at those who make artistic claims for fusion."  In 1987 Murray, Crouch, and Marsalis founded the Jazz at Lincoln Center program in New York, where Crouch and Marsalis would serve as artistic directors.  JALC would become one of the main institutional promoters of the neotraditionalist movement.

1980s: Young Lions 

Wynton Marsalis, son of jazz pianist Ellis Marsalis, emerged on the jazz scene approximately 1980 and looked to late swing music and bop trumpet players for his main influences, from trumpeter Fats Navarro to Kenny Dorham. His album Wynton Marsalis (1982) for the Columbia label was, according to the Los Angeles Times, called "the birth point of the Re-bop Renaissance." A crucial difference, however, between the neo-bop movement and its bop predecessors was that neo-bop had academic roots and rejected the "iconoclastic" and rebellious lifestyles of the bop era. Marsalis instead advocated that jazz could achieve "fine-art" status and be compared to classical music rather than rock music.

While his predecessors of the previous two decades had experienced financial success in fusion genres, his commitment to the traditional definition of "jazz" caught on with a school of musicians from Marsalis' age group, including Terence Blanchard, Donald Harrison, Wallace Roney, Kevin Eubanks, Stanley Jordan, Kenny Kirkland, and Jeff Watts. Marsalis later founded Jazz at Lincoln Center to promote jazz concerts, with further "Young Lions" becoming prominent jazz musicians including Christian McBride, Marcus Roberts, and Roy Hargrove.

1990s: Distinct subgenre 
With the revival of hard bop as mainstream jazz in the 1990s, neo-bop jazz began to form its own reputation as a distinct subgenre of jazz. According to critic Scott Yanow, this new subgenre remained related to the broader straight-ahead category, but was no longer "recycling the past" as some claimed. Alternatively, neo-bop has been criticized for lacking the innovation of the pioneering beboppers of the 1940s and 1950s and for being too reliant upon the commercial success of CD sales.

Notes 

Jazz genres
Jazz terminology